Salem metropolitan area may refer to:

 Salem, Oregon metropolitan area, United States
 Salem, Ohio micropolitan area, United States
 Salem metropolitan area (India), Tamil Nadu

See also
Salem (disambiguation)